"Hullabaloo" is a song by Australian band Absent Friends. It was released in March 1990 as the second single from third debut album Here's Looking Up Your Address. It peaked at number 46 on the Australian Singles Charts.

Track listing

Charts

References

1990 singles
1989 songs